Vyšná Kamenica is a village and municipality in Košice-okolie District in the Kosice Region of eastern Slovakia.

History
In historical records the village was first mentioned in 1427.

Geography
The village lies at an altitude of 352 metres and covers an area of 11.333 km². It has a population of almost 250 people.

Ethnicity
The population is almost entirely Slovak in ethnicity.

Culture
The village has a public library,  a football playground and food facilities.

Transport
The nearest railway station is at Ruskov.

External links

Villages and municipalities in Košice-okolie District